The Citizens' Assembly on Electoral Reform was established by the government of the province of Ontario, Canada in March 2006. Modelled on the British Columbia equivalent, it reviewed the first past the post electoral system currently in use to elect members of the Ontario Legislature, with the authority to recommend an alternative. In May 2007, the Assembly recommended, by a decision of 94–8, that Ontario adopt a form of mixed member proportional representation (MMP).

The Report of the Select Committee on Electoral Reform

The mandate of the Assembly was created by the Report of the Select Committee on Electoral Reform of the Ontario legislature. It was made up of Members of Provincial Parliament (MPPs) from the Liberal, Progressive Conservative and New Democratic parties.  The committee studied electoral systems and issued a report to the Ontario Legislature in November 2005. It recommended the Assembly be provided the latitude necessary to recommend whatever electoral system is consistent with Ontario's (and Canada's) constitution. It assessed several alternatives.

Selection

Similar to the BC Citizens' Assembly on Electoral Reform, the Ontario Assembly was composed of 103 randomly selected citizens, one from each Ontario constituency. As well, the selection process controlled for the age distribution of the province. The selection process for the Ontario Citizens' Assembly began in April 2006 and was completed in June 2006.

Prospective members of the Assembly were selected at random by Elections Ontario from the Permanent Register of Electors of Ontario. Every registered voter was eligible with the exception of elected officials. Citizens that received an invitation letter were asked if they would be interested in placing their name in the draw. Of the approximately 12,000 respondents, about 1,200 were invited to attend selection meetings across the province.

At each selection meeting, candidates decided whether to put their names into a ballot box from which one member and two alternates were selected. Ultimately, 52 of the members of the Assembly were female and 51 were male. At least one member of the Assembly was Aboriginal.

The Assembly

Under chairperson George Thomson, the independent body of citizens met twice a month from September 9, 2006 (six weekends in the fall of 2006 and six from February 17 to April 29) to examine the current electoral system. Queen's University Associate Professor of Political Science,  Jonathan Rose, led the Assembly in the Learning Phase in the fall of 2006. The Assembly also held public meetings across the province between November and January under the direction of Susan Pigott.  After learning and consultation, they spent an additional six weekends deliberating on options and whether or not to change the current system.

The Assembly's work ended with the submission of their final report due on May 15, 2007, recommending a mixed member proportional system similar to that used in New Zealand. As a result of their recommendation, Ontario voters considered changing their electoral system in the referendum held on October 10, 2007, the date of the provincial election. The referendum result was binding if passed by 60% of the vote overall, and by 50% of the vote in each of at least 64 of the 107 electoral districts (i.e. 60% of them.) This threshold was decided by the Ontario cabinet, despite the recommendation of the Select Committee that it require only 50% support in 71 of the 107 ridings.

The Students' Assembly

To complement the work on the Assembly, the provincial government provided financial support for the Students' Assembly on Electoral Reform. Composed of secondary students from across Ontario, it also concluded that Ontario should switch to the MMP (mixed member proportional) system. These findings were presented to the Citizens' Assembly on Electoral Reform on February 17, 2007.

Referendum

The Assembly's recommendation was voted upon by Ontario voters in the referendum held on October 10, 2007, at the same time as the provincial election.  The proposal was rejected by 63% of voters, meaning the status quo will stand in Ontario for now. 

By the end of the campaign, Assembly members were critical of both the media coverage of their work and of the $6.8 million educational campaign, directed by Elections Ontario.

"I'm very disappointed there's been a lack of meaningful debate," said Catherine Baquero, Assembly member for Beaches-East York.
"I'm disappointed that Elections Ontario's education campaign has been so toothless. What I expected was a more detailed discussion of the pros and cons of each system." 

"There's an awful lack of understanding on the proposition. I think that's too bad. Elections Ontario isn't doing its job," added Rick Browridge, another Assembly member. "There's been no real attempt at a major public education campaign, and that's what was needed."

Significance

The Assembly process is premised on the idea that average citizens can come together to make good decisions on various policy issues by means of deliberating these issues. In particular, it is seen as a good method for studying electoral reform as politicians face a fundamental conflict of interest when it comes to evaluating the system that elects them.

The Ontario vote is considered crucial also by advocates of Canadian federal electoral reform because the adoption of proportional representation in Canada's most populous province would provide impetus for reform and practical Canadian evidence on how proportional systems respond to voters. The referendum results and the way the referendum process was conducted stand as a warning to future attempts at electoral reform.

References

External links 
 Citizens' Assembly on Electoral Reform
 Students' Assembly on Electoral Reform
 Select Committee on Electoral Reform Report
 Government of Ontario - Democratic Renewal Secretariat
 Citizens' Assembly on Electoral Reform (British Columbia).
 Jonathan Rose, Queen's University
 J.H. Snider's Citizens' Assembly blog
 iSolon.org's clearinghouse of citizens assembly information

Political history of Ontario
Electoral reform in Canada
Electoral Reform (Ontario)
2006 establishments in Ontario